Sergi Arimany Pruenca (born 31 January 1990) is a Spanish footballer who plays as a forward for UE Llagostera.

Club career
Born in Olot, Girona, Catalonia, Arimany finished his graduation with neighbouring Girona FC. On 2 September 2009, he moved to Tercera División club UE Llagostera, making his senior debut in 2009.

Arimany continued to appear in the fourth division in the following years, representing UE Olot, SD Formentera, UE La Jonquera and Palamós CF. With the latter he scored a career-best 17 goals during the 2014–15 campaign.

In July 2015, Arimany signed for Austrian Football First League club Kapfenberger SV on a one-year contract with the option of another year. He made his professional debut on 24 July by starting in a 0–0 away draw against FC Wacker Innsbruck, and scored his first goals on 4 August, netting a double in a 5–2 home routing of FC Liefering.

In January 2016, Arimany joined German 3. Liga club FC Energie Cottbus on loan until the end of the season, with a buyout clause. He appeared sparingly, and subsequently returned to his parent club.

In January 2017, Arimany signed for Segunda División B club SD Leioa.

On 24 June 2017 he signed with Finnish side Seinäjoen Jalkapallokerho.

On 29 January 2018 Arimany signed for Segunda División B club Llagostera.

In February 2019, Arimany signed for Primera Catalana club CF Montañesa.

References

External links
 
 

1990 births
Living people
People from Olot
Sportspeople from the Province of Girona
Spanish footballers
Footballers from Catalonia
Association football forwards
Tercera División players
UE Costa Brava players
UE Olot players
Palamós CF footballers
2. Liga (Austria) players
Kapfenberger SV players
3. Liga players
FC Energie Cottbus players
Spanish expatriate footballers
Spanish expatriate sportspeople in Austria
Spanish expatriate sportspeople in Germany
Expatriate footballers in Austria
Expatriate footballers in Germany
SD Formentera players